The Roman Catholic Diocese of Calbayog is an ecclesiastical territory of the Catholic Church named after its episcopal see, Calbayog, a city on the western side of the province of Samar in the Philippines.

History 
Samar and Leyte, two civil provinces in the Visayan group of the Philippines, which include the islands of Balicuatro, Batac, Biliran, Capul, Daram, Homonhon, Leyte, Manicani, Panaon, Samar and several smaller islands, once made up the diocese of Calbayog, now a suffragan of the Metropolitan Archdiocese of Palo. The diocesan Calbayog has a cathedral dedicated to Saints Peter and Paul.

The Diocese of Calbayog is the local church comprising the civil territorial jurisdiction of western Samar Island. The island, the third largest in the Philippines, is composed of three provinces: Northern Samar with Catarman as capital, Eastern Samar with Borongan as capital and the Samar Province with Catbalogan as the capital. The City of Calbayog is where the Cathedral of the diocese is located since its ecclesiastical foundation on April 10, 1910, by Pope Pius X. The new Diocese was before made of the whole Samar and Leyte islands.

On April 28, 1934, Pope Pius XI promulgated an apostolic constitution with the incipit Romanorum Pontificum semper separating the dioceses of Cebu, Calbayog, Jaro, Bacolod, Zamboanga and Cagayan de Oro from the ecclesiastical province of Manila. The same constitution elevated the diocese of Cebu into an archdiocese while placing all the newly separated dioceses under a new ecclesiastical province with Cebu as the new metropolitan see.

Subsequently, Palo was ceded from Calbayog as a separate diocese in 1937, Borongan in 1965 and Catarman in 1975.
The historical vicissitudes of the Diocese of Calbayog cannot be fully appreciated apart from the history of the early evangelical works of the first missionaries who came to Samar. The first Jesuit missionaries reached Leyte and Samar in 1595, the islands subsequently forming part of the Diocese of Cebu until erected into a separate diocese on 10 April 1910. The first bishop was Pablo Singzon de la Anunciacion.

It was transferred to the ecclesiastical province of the Archdiocese of Palo, which was promoted to a Metropolitan Archdiocese on November 15, 1982.

Local Ordinaries

Sources and references 
  Sámar and Leyte
 GCatholic.org, with episcopal incumbent biographies

References

External links 
 diocesan website, in English

Calbayog
Calbayog
Religion in Samar (province)
Calbayog